Yanka is a Slavic name, a variation of the Serbo-Croatian Janko, Hebrew Janka, or Bulgarian Yanko. Notable people with the name include:

 Yanka Bryl,  Belarusian writer
 Yanka Dyagileva (1966–1991), Russian poet and singer-songwriter
 Yanka Kanevcheva (1878–1920), Bulgarian revolutionary
 Yanka Kupala (1882–1942), pen name of Ivan Daminikavich Lutsevich, Belarusian poet and writer
 Yanka Maur (1883–1971), Belarusian writer
 Mar R. Yanka, alternative name of Natronai ben Nehemiah, Gaon of Pumbedita from 719 to 730

See also
 

Belarusian given names